Shorea argentifolia (called, along with some other species in the genus Shorea, dark red meranti) is an emergent rainforest tree species in the family Dipterocarpaceae. It native to Borneo. It grows in mixed dipterocarp forests on hills and ridges, up to 900 metres elevation. The species is threatened by habitat loss. The tallest recorded specimen is 84.9 m tall in the Tawau Hills National Park, in Sabah.

References

argentifolia
Endemic flora of Borneo
Trees of Borneo
Flora of the Borneo lowland rain forests
Taxonomy articles created by Polbot